Garnya Cove is a -wide cove on the east coast of Robert Island in the South Shetland Islands, Antarctica.  It is entered southeast of Smirnenski Point and northwest of Perelik Point.

The feature is named after the settlement of Garnya in northern Bulgaria.

Location

Maps
 L.L. Ivanov. Antarctica: Livingston Island and Greenwich, Robert, Snow and Smith Islands. Scale 1:120000 topographic map.  Troyan: Manfred Wörner Foundation, 2009.   (Updated second edition 2010.  )
 Antarctic Digital Database (ADD). Scale 1:250000 topographic map of Antarctica. Scientific Committee on Antarctic Research (SCAR), 1993–2016.

References
 Garnya Cove. SCAR Composite Antarctic Gazetteer.
 Bulgarian Antarctic Gazetteer. Antarctic Place-names Commission. (details in Bulgarian, basic data in English)

External links
 Garnya Cove. Copernix satellite image

Coves of Robert Island
Bulgaria and the Antarctic